Otto Josias Engelbrekt Hagborg (31 August 1854, Gothenburg - 5 January 1927, London) was a Swedish genre painter and diver. His brother was the painter, August Hagborg.

Biography
After studying at Uppsala University, he travelled to Paris in 1880, where his brother was already a successful painter.

Around 1890, he settled in London with his friend, the athlete Hjalmar Johansson. There, he introduced "fancy diving" at the National Graceful Diving Competition, held by the Royal Life Saving Society in 1895.

He married the artist, Hannah Posener (1876-1957), in 1905. The following year, he went to Athens to participate in the 1906 Olympic Games in diving. He came 12th, even though, at the age of 51 years and nine months, he was the oldest participant in either swimming or diving.

He became a British subject in 1926, almost exactly a year before his death. His works may be seen at the Göteborgs konstmuseum, among others.

Gallery

References

External links 

 Profile @ the Sveriges Olympiska Kommitté

1854 births
1927 deaths
Swedish male divers
Swedish painters
Divers at the 1906 Intercalated Games
1906 Intercalated Games
People from Gothenburg